The Ballon d'Or is an annual football award presented by French news magazine France Football since 1956. Between 2010 and 2015, in an agreement with FIFA, the award was temporarily merged with the FIFA World Player of the Year (founded in 1991) and known as the FIFA Ballon d'Or. That partnership ended in 2016, and the award reverted to the Ballon d'Or, while FIFA also reverted to its own separate annual award The Best FIFA Men's Player. The recipients of the joint FIFA Ballon d'Or are considered as winners by both award organisations.

Conceived by sports writers Gabriel Hanot and Jacques Ferran, the Ballon d'Or award honours the male player deemed to have performed the best over the previous year, based on voting by football journalists, from 1956 to 2006. Originally, it was awarded only to players from Europe and widely known as the European Footballer of the Year award. In 1995, the Ballon d'Or was expanded to include all players from any origin that have been active at European clubs.

After 2007, coaches and captains of national teams were also given the right to vote. The award became a global prize in 2007 with all professional footballers from around the world being eligible. In 2022, France Football modified the rules for the Ballon d'Or. They changed the timing so that awards were given not for achievements during a calendar year, but for a football season. It was also decided that only those countries in the top 100 of the FIFA World Ranking would be allowed to vote.

History
Stanley Matthews of England was the inaugural winner of the Ballon d'Or. Prior to 2007, the award was generally known as the continental European Footballer of the Year award in English language and much international media. Even after 2007, it was usually identified with and referred to by that name because of its origin as a European award, until it was merged with FIFA's World Player award cementing its new worldwide claim. Liberia's George Weah, the only African recipient, became the first non-European to win the award in 1995, the year that rules of eligibility were changed. Ronaldo of Brazil became the first South American winner two years later.

Lionel Messi has won the award a record seven times, followed by Cristiano Ronaldo with five. Three players have won the award three times each: Johan Cruyff, Michel Platini, and Marco van Basten. With seven awards each, Dutch, German, Argentine, Portuguese and French players have won the most Ballons d'Or. Players from Germany (1972, 1981) and the Netherlands (1988) occupied the top-three top spots in a single year (a feat achieved only three times in history). German (1972) and Italian (1988–1990) clubs achieved the same feat, including two individual years dominated by AC Milan players (1988, 1989), a unique record until Spanish clubs experienced an unforeseen dominance (2009–2012, 2015, 2016) and Barcelona (2010) became the second club to occupy the top-three. Two Spanish clubs, Barcelona and Real Madrid, also lead the ranking for producing the most winners, with 12 wins each.

Between 2010 and 2015 inclusive, the award was merged with a similar one, the FIFA World Player of the Year award, to create the FIFA Ballon d'Or, which was awarded to the world's best male player before FIFA and France Football decided not to continue the merging agreement. After 2011, UEFA created the UEFA Best Player in Europe Award to maintain the tradition of the original Ballon d'Or of specifically honouring a football player from Europe.

In 2020, the Group L'Équipe, to which France Football belongs, decided that no award would be given for the year due to the COVID-19 pandemic cutting short the seasons of football clubs worldwide. The widespread public opinion is that the 2020 award should have been given to Robert Lewandowski.

The award shows a bias in favor of attacking players, which has increased in recent years, especially after 2007. Over time, the award has gone to a more exclusive set of leagues and clubs. Prior to 1995, 10 leagues supplied Ballon d'Or winners, whereas only England, France, Germany, Italy, and Spain have supplied winners since 1995. Spain's La Liga has the most Ballon d'Or winners. Barcelona and Real Madrid have supplied the most Ballon d'Or winners since 1995.

In 2022, France Football modified the rules for the Ballon d'Or. They changed the timing so that awards were given not for achievements during a calendar year, but for a football season. It was also decided that only those countries in the top 100 of the FIFA World Ranking would be allowed to vote. The plebiscite had previously been open to all countries since 2007. This brought the Ballon d'Or into line with the UEFA Men's Player of the Year Award which was slightly less dominated by exclusive leagues and, in particular, Cristiano Ronaldo and Lionel Messi in recent years.

Nine players (Bobby Charlton, Franz Beckenbauer, Gerd Müller, Paolo Rossi, Zinedine Zidane, Rivaldo, Ronaldinho, Kaká, and Lionel Messi) have won the FIFA World Cup, the European Cup/UEFA Champions League, and the Ballon d'Or during their careers. Gerd Müller and Lionel Messi are the only two players who have won the 3 aforementioned titles and the European Golden Shoe during their careers.

Winners
Note: Until 2021, the Ballon d'Or was awarded based on player performance during the calendar year. Since 2022, jurors have been instructed to take into account the previous season.

Wins by player

Wins by country

Wins by club

Additional awards
An honorary award, under the name Super Ballon d'Or, was awarded to Alfredo Di Stéfano in 1989, after he surpassed Johan Cruyff and Michel Platini in France Footballs voting.

A decade later, France Football elected Pelé the Football Player of the Century after consulting their former Ballon d'Or recipients. Among the 34 previous winners, 30 cast their votes, while Stanley Matthews, Omar Sívori and George Best abstained, and Lev Yashin had died. Each voter was allotted five votes worth up to five points; however, Di Stéfano only chose a first place, Platini a first and second place, and George Weah two players for fifth place. Pelé was named the greatest by 17 voters, receiving almost double the number of points earned by the runner-up, Diego Maradona.

To coincide with the 60th anniversary of the Ballon d'Or in 2016, France Football published a reevaluation of the awards presented before 1995, when only European players were eligible to win the award. 12 out of the 39 Ballons d'Or presented during this time period would have been awarded to South American players; in addition to Pelé and Diego Maradona, Garrincha, Mario Kempes, and Romário were retrospectively recognized as worthy winners. The original recipients, however, remain unchanged.

Maradona and Pelé also received honorary Ballons d'Ors for their services to football in 1995 and 2013, respectively.

In 1978, France Football published an article about that year's South American Footballer of the Year award in which they hypothesised a match between a South American All-Star Team and a European All-Star team, featuring the players who had performed the best in the award rankings.

Since 2021, France Football has given the "Goalscorer of the Year" award, which was won in its first edition by Robert Lewandowski in recognition of the record-breaking 41 league goals he scored that year. The "Best Club of the Year" award is also given from the same year onward, with Chelsea having been the inaugural winner. Since 2022 an additional award, the "Socrates Trophy", has been given to the footballer with the best humanitarian efforts, with Sadio Mané becoming the first recipient. The "Goalscorer of the Year" award was renamed into the "Gerd Müller Trophy" in honour of Gerd Müller the same year.

Ballon d'Or Dream Team

See also
Super Ballon d’Or
The Best FIFA Football Awards
FIFPro World11
Ballon d'Or Féminin
Gerd Müller Trophy
Kopa Trophy
Yashin Trophy
UEFA Men's Player of the Year Award
UEFA Club Footballer of the Year
Bravo Award
Golden Boy
Golden Player

Notes

References

External links

 
Awards disestablished in 2009
Awards established in 1956
Awards established in 2016
U
France Football awards
1956 establishments in Europe
2016 establishments in Europe